Shingleside is a historic home in Rochester in Monroe County, New York.  It was constructed in 1898–1899 and is an L-shaped, -story, wood-framed, wood-shingled, gambrel-roofed house.  It was designed by noted local architect Claude Fayette Bragdon in a style influenced by the Shingle and Colonial Revival styles.

It was listed on the National Register of Historic Places in 1984.

References

Houses in Rochester, New York
Houses on the National Register of Historic Places in New York (state)
Colonial Revival architecture in New York (state)
Houses completed in 1899
Shingle Style houses
National Register of Historic Places in Rochester, New York
Shingle Style architecture in New York (state)